Mohamed Karim Meliani (born 3 September 1987) is an Algerian-French professional footballer who plays for French lower-league club RCF Paris.

External links
 
 
 Player Profile at SO Foot

1986 births
Living people
French sportspeople of Algerian descent
People from Nanterre
Footballers from Hauts-de-Seine
Association football midfielders
French footballers
Championnat National players
Championnat National 2 players
Championnat National 3 players
Algerian Ligue Professionnelle 1 players
Red Star F.C. players
Olympique Noisy-le-Sec players
AC Amiens players
Amiens SC players
ASO Chlef players
MO Béjaïa players
Racing Club de France Football players